The First Methodist Church in Monroe, Green County, Wisconsin, now the Monroe Arts Center, is a Gothic Revival edifice designed by the former Wisconsin State Architect E. Townsend Mix of Milwaukee and constructed of Cream City brick.  It was commissioned in 1869 by the First Methodist Episcopal congregation of Monroe to replace an earlier church building that dated to 1843.  The adjacent parsonage was completed in 1886, and the complete ensemble was finally dedicated in 1887.

With its pointed-arch windows as well as the steeply pitched roof and tall, narrow tower, the church exemplifies the late-Gothic revival style.  The angled corner belfry tower and decorative brickwork are additional hallmarks of Mix's design.  Perhaps the most striking feature is the rose window with elaborate tracery on the front facade, composed of teardrop-shaped stained-glass panes.

The building was added to the National Register of Historic Places in 1975.

Monroe Arts Center
In 1976, the non-profit Monroe Arts Center, which was formed to purchase the building, took ownership and opened it to the community for performances and exhibitions.

Gallery

References

External links

Monroe Arts Center

Churches in Green County, Wisconsin
Churches on the National Register of Historic Places in Wisconsin
Gothic Revival church buildings in Wisconsin
Churches completed in 1869
19th-century Methodist church buildings in the United States
Methodist churches in Wisconsin
Tourist attractions in Green County, Wisconsin
1869 establishments in Wisconsin
National Register of Historic Places in Green County, Wisconsin